The Philippine hawk-eagle or north Philippine hawk-eagle (Nisaetus philippensis), earlier treated under Spizaetus, is a species of bird of prey in the family Accipitridae. Many taxonomists consider the Pinsker's hawk-eagle, a former subspecies, raised to full species status. It is endemic to the Philippines. Its natural habitat is tropical moist lowland forests. It is threatened by habitat loss and trapping.

Description 
The Philippine hawk-eagle is a large raptor with a dark brown upper plumage and a pale brown belly. Head and chest are streaked and the lower belly is finely barred. The species has a conspicuous backwards crest. Juveniles are paler. The call a high, screeching “week wik!” or single “week!”.

Habitat 
It inhabits primary and secondary forest, occasionally frequenting clearings and cultivations, from the lowlands to lower mountain slopes. Majority of records are below 1,000 meters above sea level.

Conservation
The IUCN Red List has assessed this bird as endangered with the population being estimated at 400 to 600 mature individuals remaining and still continuing to decrease. This species' main threat is habitat loss with wholesale clearance of forest habitats as a result of logging, agricultural conversion and mining activities occurring within the range. It is also trapped and hunted for food and the pet trade.

It occurs in a few protected areas including Mt. Makiling National Park, Mount Isarog National Park, Kalbario–Patapat Natural Park, Northern Sierra Madre Natural Park and Bataan National Park. However, as is the case for most of the Philippines protection and enforcement from logging and hunting is lax. 

Conservation actions proposed include to surveys in area from which the species is known and propose formal protection. Study the species's ecology, particularly home-range size and dispersal ability to help inform a global population estimate and assess the likely impact of habitat fragmentation. Promote more effective enforcement of legislation designed to control hunting and trading. Assess forest loss in the Philippines and gauge the species's likely rate of decline and degree of fragmentation of its populations. Research hunting and trade by interviewing local people and visiting wildlife markets.

References

External links

BirdLife Species Factsheet.

Philippine hawk-eagle
Endemic birds of the Philippines
Philippine hawk-eagle
Taxonomy articles created by Polbot